The 2021–22 season was the 115th in the history of SV Waldhof Mannheim and their third consecutive season in the third division. The club participated in 3. Liga and DFB-Pokal.

Players

Transfers

Pre-season and friendlies

Competitions

Overall record

3. Liga

League table

Results summary

Results by round

Matches 
The league fixtures were announced on 1 July 2021.

DFB-Pokal

References 

SV Waldhof Mannheim
Waldhof Mannheim